The 2007 World Solar Challenge was one of a biennial series of solar-powered car races, covering  through the Australian Outback, from Darwin, Northern Territory to Adelaide, South Australia.

In the Challenge class 19 teams started, of which 10 completed the course, and the winner was a Nuna car built by Nuon of the Netherlands. In the Adventure class 18 teams started and eight completed the course, the winner being Ashiya University of Japan.

Challenge class

Adventure class

References

 WSC 2007 results

Solar car races
Scientific organisations based in Australia
Science competitions
Photovoltaics
Recurring sporting events established in 1987